The 2004 North Carolina Tar Heels football team represented the University of North Carolina at Chapel Hill as a member of the Atlantic Coast Conference (ACC) during the 2004 NCAA Division I-A football season. Led by third-year head coach John Bunting, the Tar Heels played their home games at Kenan Memorial Stadium in Chapel Hill, North Carolina. North Carolina finished the season 6–6 overall and 5–3 in ACC play to tie for third place. They lost to Boston College in the Continental Tire Bowl.

Schedule

Coaching staff

Team statistics

References

North Carolina
North Carolina Tar Heels football seasons
North Carolina Tar Heels football